Parole, a suburb of Annapolis, is a census-designated place (CDP) in Anne Arundel County, Maryland, United States. The population was 15,922 at the 2010 census. It is where several major roads intersect at the western edge of the state capital, Annapolis, and contains the Annapolis Mall, and a number of other large shopping centers, and the Anne Arundel Medical Center. It is generally considered to be part of Annapolis rather than a separate town. The neighborhood was named because it was a parole camp, where Union and Confederate prisoners of war were brought for mutual exchange and eventual return to their respective homes.

Geography
Parole is located at  (38.991657, −76.548450). It is bordered to the southeast by the city of Annapolis and by the CDP of Annapolis Neck. To the northeast is the Severn River, with the Arnold CDP on the other side. To the southwest is the South River, with the CDP of Riva on the other side.

U.S. Route 50 is a six-to-eight-lane expressway that runs through the community, leading west to Washington, D.C. and east to the Chesapeake Bay Bridge and Maryland's Eastern Shore. The highway intersects Interstate 97, which leads north to Baltimore, along the northern edge of the CDP.

Demographics

As of the census of 2000, there were 14,031 people, 6,645 households, and 3,707 families residing in the CDP. The racial makeup of the CDP was 90.36% White, 6.49% African American, 0.21% Native American, 1.53% Asian, 0.08% Pacific Islander, 0.34% from other races, and 0.98% from two or more races. Hispanic or Latino of any race were 1.56% of the population.

There were 6,645 households, out of which 14.1% had children under the age of 18 living with them, 48.7% were married couples living together, 5.3% had a female householder with no husband present, and 44.2% were non-families. 37.7% of all households were made up of individuals, and 18.4% had someone living alone who was 65 years of age or older. The average household size was 1.96 and the average family size was 2.54.

In the CDP, the population was spread out, with 12.2% under the age of 18, 5.8% from 18 to 24, 27.4% from 25 to 44, 27.6% from 45 to 64, and 27.0% who were 65 years of age or older. The median age was 48 years. For every 100 females, there were 93.7 males. For every 100 females age 18 and over, there were 91.6 males.

The median income for a household in the CDP was $67,479, and the median income for a family was $82,988. Males had a median income of $60,601 versus $43,610 for females. The per capita income for the CDP was $39,102. About 0.2% of families and 2.7% of the population were below the poverty line, including 1.0% of those under age 18 and 3.5% of those age 65 or over.

Government and infrastructure
The Maryland Department of Agriculture has its headquarters in Parole.

Education
Anne Arundel County Public Schools has its headquarters in Parole. Rolling Knolls Elementary and Annapolis High School are also in Parole.

The headquarters of the Anne Arundel County Public Library are in Parole; this is not a library branch.

References

Census-designated places in Maryland
Census-designated places in Anne Arundel County, Maryland
Suburbs of Annapolis, Maryland